The Second Earth: The Pentateuch Re-told is a novel by Patrick Woodroffe published in 1987.

Plot summary
The Second Earth: The Pentateuch Re-told is author-illustrated.

Reception
Dave Langford reviewed The Second Earth: The Pentateuch Re-told for White Dwarf #99, and stated that "its prose content asphyxiates in the rarefied air of quasi-biblical High Style which even Tolkien couldn't bring off."

Reviews
Review by Andy Robertson (1988) in Interzone, #24 Summer 1988

References

1987 novels